825 Tanina (prov. designation:  or ) is a stony background asteroid from the region of the Flora family, located in the inner part of the asteroid belt. It was discovered on 27 March 1916, by Russian astronomer Grigory Neujmin at the Simeiz Observatory on Crimea. Any reference of the asteroid's name to a person is unknown.

Orbit and classification 

Tanina is a non-family asteroid of the main belt's background population when applying the hierarchical clustering method (HCM) by Nesvorný to its proper orbital elements. In the 1995 HCM-analysis by Zappalà, however, Tanina is a member of the Flora family, a giant asteroid family and the largest family of stony asteroids in the main-belt. In the HCM-analysis by Milani and Knežević (AstDys), it is also a background asteroid as this analysis does not recognize the Flora asteroid clan. The asteroid orbits the Sun in the inner main-belt at a distance of 2.1–2.4 AU once every 3 years and 4 months (1,213 days; semi-major axis of 2.23 AU). Its orbit has an eccentricity of 0.08 and an inclination of 3° with respect to the ecliptic.

Discovery 

Tanina was discovered by Russian astronomer Grigory Neujmin at the Simeiz Observatory on Crimean peninsula on 27 March 1916. One week later, on 3 April 1916, it was independently discovered by Max Wolf at the Heidelberg Observatory in Germany. The Minor Planet Center only recognizes the first discoverer.

Naming 

This minor planet was named "Tanina". Any reference of its name to a person or occurrence is unknown.

Unknown meaning 

Among the many thousands of named minor planets, Tanina is one of 120 asteroids for which  has been published. All of these asteroids have low numbers, the first one being . They were discovered between 1876 and the 1930s, predominantly by astronomers Auguste Charlois, Johann Palisa, Max Wolf and Karl Reinmuth.

Physical characteristics 

In the Tholen classification, Tanina is closest to a stony S-type asteroid, and somewhat similar to an uncommon R-type asteroid, while in the SMASS classification by Bus–Binzel, Tanina is a common S-type asteroid.

Rotation period 

In February 2002, a rotational lightcurve of Tanina was obtained from photometric observations by Italian astronomer Andrea Ferrero at the Bigmuskie Observatory . Lightcurve analysis gave a well-defined rotation period of  hours with a high brightness variation of  magnitude, indicative of an elongated, non-spherical shape. The result supersedes previous period determinations of  hours with an amplitude of  magnitude by Wiesław Z. Wiśniewski from February 1992, and  hours with an amplitude of  magnitude by Agnieszka Kryszczyńska in May 1999. In 2011, a modeled lightcurve using data from the Uppsala Asteroid Photometric Catalogue (UAPC) and other sources gave a sidereal period  hours, as well as two spin axes at (46.0°, 48.0°) and (231.0°, 60.0°) in ecliptic coordinates (λ, β).

Diameter and albedo 

The Collaborative Asteroid Lightcurve Link adopts an albedo of 0.1508 from Petr Pravec's revised WISE data, and takes a diameter of 14.67 kilometers based on an absolute magnitude of 11.84.

References

External links 
 Lightcurve Database Query (LCDB), at www.minorplanet.info
 Dictionary of Minor Planet Names, Google books
 Asteroids and comets rotation curves, CdR – Geneva Observatory, Raoul Behrend
 Discovery Circumstances: Numbered Minor Planets (1)-(5000) – Minor Planet Center
 
 

000825
Discoveries by Grigory Neujmin
Named minor planets
000825
000825
19160327